The Association for the Social Scientific Study of Jewry (ASSJ) is a cross-disciplinary organization of individuals whose research concerns the Jewish people throughout the world founded in 1971.

Purpose
The ASSJ comprises primarily academics, but also policy analysts, communal professionals, and activists whose research concerns the Jewish people throughout the world. Social scientific disciplines represented include sociology, social psychology, social anthropology, demography, contemporary history, social work, political science, economics, and Jewish education. Members work throughout the world but primarily in North America, Israel, and Europe.

The ASSJ encourages and facilitates contact among researchers, supports the dissemination of research, and assists in the cultivation of younger scholars.

Past presidents
Mervin F. Verbit (1971-1973)
Marshall Sklare (1973-1975)
Samuel Klausner (1975-1977)
Celia Heller (1977-1979)
Chaim Waxman (1979-1981)
Harold Himmelfarb (1981-1983)
Egon Mayer (1983-1988)
Rela Mintz Geffen (1988-1990)
Arnold Dashefsky (1990-1996)
Allen Glicksman (1996-2000)
 Sherry Israel (2000-2005)
Harriet Hartman (2005-2012)
Steven M. Cohen (2012-2016)
Leonard Saxe (2016-2020)
 Judit Bokser Liwerant (2020-)

Past vice presidents
 Harriet Hartman
 Shaul Kelner (2005-2008)
 Sylvia Barack Fishman (2008-2012)
 Sergio DellaPergola (2012-2016)
 Sarah Benor (2016-2018)
 Judit Bokser Liwerant (2018-2020)
 Laurence Kotler-Berkowitz (2020-)

Past treasurers
 Carmel Chiswick
 Gail Glicksman
 Bruce Phillips (2012-2015)
 Leonard Saxe (2015-2016)
 Matthew Boxer (2016-2021)

Past secretaries
 Uzi Rebhun
 Benjamin Phillips (2008-2010)
 Theodore Sasson (2010-2012)
 Matthew Boxer (2012-2016)
 Jennifer Thompson (2016-2020)
 Bruce Phillips (2020-)

Past at-large members of the board
 Tobin Belzer
 Lila Corwin Berman
 Mijal Bitton
 Paul Burstein
 Barry Chiswick
 Steven M. Cohen
 Arnold Dashefsky
 Bethamie Horowitz
 Ari Kelman
 Ariela Keysar
 Helen Kim
 Moshe Kornfeld
 Laurence Kotler-Berkowitz
 Shawn Landres
 Lilach Lev Ari
 Laura Limonic
 Keren McGinity
 Bruce Phillips
 Riv-Ellen Prell
 Uzi Rebhun
 Sherry Rosen
 Leonard Saxe
 Randal Schnoor
 Ira Sheskin
 Jennifer Thompson

Past student representatives to the board
 Mijal Bitton
 Matthew Boxer
 Shaul Kelner
 Moshe Kornfeld
 Meredith Woocher
 Amir Segal

Publication
The organization publishes a journal, Contemporary Jewry, several times a year with research articles that draw on a range of social scientific fields and methodologies.

The Marshall Sklare Award
The Marshall Sklare Award is an annual honor of the Association for the Social Scientific Study of Jewry (ASSJ). The ASSJ seeks to recognize "a senior scholar who has made a significant scholarly contribution to the social scientific study of Jewry." In most cases, the recipient has given a scholarly address. In recent years, the honored scholar has presented the address at the annual meeting of the Association for Jewish Studies. The award is named after sociologist Marshall Sklare.

References

External links
ASSJ website
ASSJ full-text publications on the Berman Jewish Policy Archive @ NYU Wagner
Contemporary Jewry full text articles on the Berman Jewish Policy Archive @ NYU Wagner

Jewish society
Social sciences organizations
Ethnic studies organizations
Organizations established in 1971
1971 establishments in the United States